The LNWR 17in Coal Engine was a class of 0-6-0 steam tender engines designed by Francis Webb for the London and North Western Railway. They were simple locomotives and in UK service they were very reliable. "17in" refers to their cylinder diameter in inches. They were called "Coal Engines" because they were used for hauling coal trains.

Design and Construction
The 17in Coal was the first new design of engine to be built by Webb since he became Chief Engineer of the LNWR in September 1871. A policy of 'low costs' was in force  at the LNWR, with running costs per engine mile reduced from d per engine mile in 1857 to d by 1871. The first 17in Coal was constructed in 1873, the first of almost five hundred built. Ernest L. Ahrons is quoted as regarding the type as "probably the simplest and cheapest locomotives ever made in this country", and O. S. Nock described them as "splendid".

Many aspects of the 17in Coal's design reflected John Ramsbottom's final design: the 0-6-0 Special Tank, including the identical wheel diameter and cylinder dimensions, but the new engines had a larger, improved boiler. In February 1878, one engine of this design was built from scratch in  hours.

Operation
During the First World War the Railway Operating Division of the Royal Engineers took many Coal Engines for use overseas, including many to the British Expeditionary Force in France and 42 to the Palestine Military Railway. Those in Palestine were reported to have performed badly and Palestine Railways sold them all for scrap by 1922. This may have been due partly to the poor quality of water used in Palestine.

227 Coal Engines passed into LMS stock after the 1923 grouping. 35 survived until the nationalisation of Britain's Railways in 1948 and entered British Railways stock.  BR numbers were 58321-58361 (with gaps).

References

Bibliography

Coal engine
0-6-0 locomotives
Railway locomotives introduced in 1873
Railway Operating Division locomotives
Scrapped locomotives
Standard gauge steam locomotives of Great Britain
C n2 locomotives
Freight locomotives